Miloslav Duffek (1928-25 February 2023 in Geneva) was a former Czechoslovak-Swiss slalom canoeist who competed from the early 1950s to the mid-1960s. He won a silver medal in the folding K-1 event at the 1955 ICF Canoe Slalom World Championships in Tacen.

Duffek popularized the bow draw stroke, aka "Duffek Stroke", as an effective means of pivoting a kayak. Before the bow stroke was popularized, only forward and reverse sweep strokes were generally used to turn a kayak. The Duffek Stroke turned a multi-stroke operation into a single stroke, which could then be combined with a forward stroke to continue momentum.

References

External links 
 Miloslav DUFFEK at CanoeSlalom.net
 https://paddlinglife.com Remembering Milo: An Ode to the Duffek Stroke (and Milo's "Duffektion") by Eugene Buchanan, January 15, 2023.

Living people
Czechoslovak male canoeists
Swiss male canoeists
Year of birth missing (living people)
International whitewater paddlers
Medalists at the ICF Canoe Slalom World Championships